Río Oscuro (English: Dark River) is a Chilean telenovela produced by AGTV Producciones and broadcast by Canal 13 since May 27, 2019.

Cast

Main cast 
Amparo Noguera as Clara Molina
Claudia Di Girolamo as Concepción Aldunate
Julio Milostich as Juan Echeverría
Mariana Di Girolamo as Rosario Correa
José Antonio Raffo as Manuel Valdivieso
Gabriel Cañas as Alberto Echeverría

Supporting cast 
Mauricio Pesutic as Francisco Javier Guzman
Josefina Fiebelkorn as Adela Echeverría
Alejandra Fosalba as Angélica López
Marcial Tagle as Custodio Pereira
Lorena Bosch as Rosa Mardones
Carlos Díaz as Rafael Morales
Katyna Huberman as Josefina Cruz
Alonso Quintero as Pedro Salgado
Antonia Giesen as María Pereira
Alejandro Fajardo as Claudio Baeza
Seide Tosta as Antonia Noble
Yohan Aguiar as Eugenio Baeza

Guest appearances 
Álvaro Morales as Fernando García
Nelson Brodt as Mario Rodríguez
Hugo Medina as Eusebio Llanos
Betsy Camino as Luisa Baeza
Elvis Fuentes as the prosecutor in the Manuel case.
Gustavo Garcés as Jesús

References

External links 
  

2019 Chilean television series debuts
2019 telenovelas
Chilean telenovelas
Canal 13 (Chilean TV channel) telenovelas
Spanish-language telenovelas